Estradiol dipropionate/hydroxyprogesterone caproate (EDP/OHPC), sold under the brand name EP Hormone Depot, is a combined estrogen–progestogen medication which is used in Japan. It is manufactured by Teikoku Zoki Pharmaceutical Co., Tokyo and contains 1 mg/mL estradiol dipropionate and 50 mg/mL hydroxyprogesterone caproate.

See also
 Estradiol benzoate/hydroxyprogesterone caproate
 Estradiol valerate/hydroxyprogesterone caproate
 List of combined sex-hormonal preparations

References

Combined estrogen–progestogen formulations